The Ministry of Works and Transport is a government ministry of Namibia. It was established in 1990 as Ministry of Public Works, Transport and Communication and got its  name in 2008 when the communication portfolio was moved to the information ministry.

The head office is located in the MWT Head Office Building in Windhoek. As of 2020 John Mutorwa is the minister.

Agencies
The Namibia Civil Aviation Authority (NCAA) and the Directorate of Aircraft Accident Investigations (DAAI) are part of the Ministry of Works and Transport.

Ministers
All works and transport ministers in chronological order are:

References

External links

 Ministry of Works and Transport

Works and transport
Namibia
Namibia
Transport organisations based in Namibia
1990 establishments in Namibia
Works and transport ministers of Namibia